The Messenian Gulf (Messiniakós Kólpos) is a sea that is part of the Ionian Sea.  The gulf is circumscribed by the southern coasts of Messenia and the  southwestern coast of the Mani peninsula in Laconia. Its bounds are Venetiko Island to the west and Cape Tainaron to the southeast. The western shores are mostly low-lying, fertile and well-developed, while the eastern shore is dominated by the southern foothills of the Taygetos and comparatively rocky and inaccessible, with few settlements.

The Pamisos River flows into the gulf near the port city of Kalamata, which is the gulf's major urban centre.

Places by the gulf
 Koroni - west
 Longa - west
 Petalidi - northwest
 Messini - northwest
 Kalamata - northeast
 Kardamyli - east
 Stoupa - east
 Agios Nikolaos - east
 Trahila - southeast
 Areopoli - southeast
 Gerolimenas - southeast

External links
 

Gulfs of the Ionian Sea
Gulfs of Greece
Landforms of Messenia
Landforms of Peloponnese (region)